See the Sun is the second LP by the American alternative rock band Black Lab. The album was released eight years after their debut, Your Body Above Me. Five of the twelve songs on the album had been released in 2003 on the EP I Feel Fine including "Learn to Crawl" that first appeared in Music from and Inspired by Spider-Man.

Track listing
"See the Sun"
"Remember"
"Lonely Boy"
"Perfect Girl"
"Ecstasy"
"Tell Me Why"
"Without You"
"Dream in Color"
"Learn to Crawl"
"Wide Open"
"Lifelike"
"Circus Lights"

References

2005 albums
Black Lab albums